The  Ministry of Commerce (Bāṇijya mantraṇālaẏa) is a ministry of Bangladesh. The ministry is responsible for regulation and implementation of policies applicable to domestic and foreign trade.

Directorate
Bangladesh Competition Commission
Bangladesh Tariff Commission
Office of the Registrar of Joint Stock Companies and Firms
Import and Export Control Department
The Institute of Cost and Management Accountants
The Institute of Chartered Accountants of Bangladesh
National Consumer Rights Protection Department
Trading Corporation of Bangladesh (TCB)
Bangladesh Tea Board
Bangladesh Foreign Trade Institute
Bangladesh Export Promotion Bureau
Bangladesh Tea Research Institute
Business Promotion Council

References

 
Commerce
Economy of Bangladesh
Bangladesh